Parcellite is a lightweight, tiny and free clipboard manager for Linux with a small memory footprint.

Fork 

Since development of Parcellite has slowed, a fork of it, ClipIt has appeared. Developed by Cristian Henzel, it fixes numerous bugs and offers a better user experience, however the last commit was in 2018. Most importantly, it improves support for Unity AppIndicators, UTF-8, and adds support for GTK+ 3, last commit

Similar Software 
 Glipper
 Klipper
 Diodon

See also 
 Clipboard manager

References

Clipboard (computing)
Linux software
GNOME Applications
Clipboard utilities that use GTK